Luciana Silveyra  (born February 11, 1976, in Mexico City) is a Mexican actress, best known for her roles in the telenovelas Rosa diamante, Nora and Señora Acero.

Filmography

Films

Television

References

External links 

1976 births
Living people
Mexican people of German descent
Mexican people of Portuguese descent
Mexican telenovela actresses
Mexican film actresses
Actresses from Mexico City
21st-century Mexican actresses